In Southern Chinese folklore, the Five Elders of Shaolin, also known as the Five Generals are the survivors of one of the destructions of the Shaolin temple by the Qing Dynasty, variously said to have taken place in 1647 or in 1732.

The original Shaolin Monastery was built on the north side of Shaoshi Mountain, the central peak of Mount Song, one of the sacred mountains of China, located in the Henan Province, by Emperor Xiaowen of the Northern Wei Dynasty in 477.  At various times throughout history, the monastery has been destroyed (burned down) for political reasons, and rebuilt many times.

A number of traditions also make reference to a Southern Shaolin Monastery located in Fujian province. Associated with stories of the supposed burning of Shaolin by the Qing government and with the tales of the Five Elders, this temple, sometimes known by the name Changlin, is often claimed to have been either the target of Qing forces or a place of refuge for monks displaced by attacks on the original Shaolin Monastery. Besides the debate over the historicity of the Qing-era destruction, it is unknown whether there was a true southern temple, with several locations in Fujian given as the site for the monastery. Fujian does have a historic monastery called Changlin, and a monastery referred to as a "Shaolin cloister" has existed in Fuqing, Fujian, since the Song Dynasty. Whether these have any actual connection to the Henan monastery or a martial tradition is still unknown.

The Five Elders of Shaolin
Within many martial arts circles, the original Five Elders of Shaolin are said to be:

The Five Family Elders
The founders of the five major family styles of Southern Chinese martial arts were all students of Gee Sin (see above), and are sometimes referred to as the Five Elders. This has caused some confusion.

See also

 Fong Sai-Yuk
 Shaolin kung fu
 Tiandihui/Hongmen

References

Further reading 

 

Chinese martial arts
Shaolin Temple